Luis Gustavo Soler Magadán (born 9 June 1951) is an Argentine football coach and former professional player who is the manager of Ecuadorian club Barcelona SC.

Career
Born in Buenos Aires, Soler played as a defender for Spanish club Recreativo de Huelva.

He was appointed manager of Ecuadorian club Barcelona SC in August 2013.

References

1951 births
Living people
Argentine footballers
Argentine expatriate footballers
Argentine football managers
Argentine expatriate football managers
Recreativo de Huelva players
Association football defenders
Expatriate footballers in Spain
Argentine expatriate sportspeople in Spain
Expatriate football managers in Ecuador
Argentine expatriate sportspeople in Ecuador
Barcelona S.C. managers
C.D. Universidad Católica del Ecuador managers
Footballers from Buenos Aires
C.D. Cuenca managers
Arsenal de Sarandí managers
Club Guaraní managers